Mannosidosis is a deficiency in mannosidase, an enzyme.

There are two types:
 Alpha-mannosidosis
 Beta-mannosidosis

See also
Swainsonine

References

Glycoprotein metabolism disorders